Rhachoepalpus metallicus, commonly called the metallic tachinid fly, is species of fly in the family Tachinidae. It was described by Charles Curran in 1947. It is found in tropical parts of South America.

Description 
It is 12–15 mm(0.5-0.75 in) long. It is a striking metallic blue in color. Its abdomen is covered with long, erect bristles.

Distribution 
The species is found in the Andes.

References 

Insects described in 1947